Malvaviscus palmanus is an understory tree of the Costa Rican cloud forest.

Distribution
It is endemic to Costa Rica in the Talamancan montane forests ecoregion.

Description
Like several other species in its genus, it has large red flowers, which are pollinated by hummingbirds.

References

palmanus
Endemic flora of Costa Rica
Trees of Costa Rica
Plants described in 1897